Club Atlético Banco de la Provincia de Buenos Aires, simply known as Banco Provincia is a sports club based in the city of Vicente López in the homonymous partido of Greater Buenos Aires. The club, mostly known for its men's and women's field hockey teams, hosts a wide variety of sports such as basketball, football, gymnastics, golf, swimming, tennis, martial arts amongst other sports and social activities.

The men's team has won 8 Metropolitano titles, being the last one in 2015, when both teams, men's and women's, won their respective championships.

Titles

Men's field hockey
Metropolitano de Primera División (11):
 1999, 2000, 2002, 2004, 2011, 2012, 2013, 2015, 2016, 2018, 2019

References

External links
 

Basketball teams established in 1918
Field hockey clubs established in 1918
b
Banco
1918 establishments in Argentina